Richard Eugene Garmaker (October 29, 1932 – June 13, 2020) was an American basketball player who played professionally in the National Basketball Association (NBA) from 1955 to 1961.

College career
Garmaker was a 6'3" guard/forward from the University of Minnesota.  He was a 1955 consensus All-American for the Golden Gophers, along with Sihugo Green (Duquesne), Tom Gola (LaSalle), Bill Russell (San Francisco) and Dick Ricketts (Duquesne).

Professional career
He was drafted by the NBA's Minneapolis Lakers twice (in 1954 and again in 1955) and joined the team for the 1955–56 NBA season.  In his four-and-a-half seasons with the Lakers, Garmaker appeared as an NBA All-Star four times.  He had his finest season in 1956–57, in which he ranked tenth in the league in points per game (16.3) and earned a spot on the All-NBA second team.  In 1960, he was traded to the New York Knicks for Ray Felix and a draft pick, and he retired with the Knicks in 1961, having scored 5,597 career points.

Death
Dick Garmaker died at age 87 on June 13, 2020.

NBA career statistics

Regular season

Playoffs

References

External links
Career stats @basketball-reference.com

1932 births
2020 deaths
All-American college men's basketball players
American men's basketball players
Basketball players from Minnesota
Hibbing High School alumni
Junior college men's basketball players in the United States
Minneapolis Lakers draft picks
Minneapolis Lakers players
Minnesota Golden Gophers men's basketball players
National Basketball Association All-Stars
New York Knicks players
Shooting guards
Small forwards
Sportspeople from Hibbing, Minnesota